Lupinus variicolor (varied lupine, manycolored lupine, Lindley's varied lupine or varicolored lupine) is a shrub in the lupine (lupin) genus Lupinus.

Lupinus variicolor is endemic to California where it occurs mostly along the northern coast, though it has also been reported in Sutter County, California. It is one of the foodplants of the endangered mission blue butterfly.

References

External links
Jepson Manual Treatment

variicolor
Endemic flora of California
Flora without expected TNC conservation status